Death of a Soldier is a 1986 Australian film based on the life of American serial killer Eddie Leonski. The film was shot using locations around Melbourne, Victoria.

The film is directed by Philippe Mora and stars James Coburn, Bill Hunter and Reb Brown.

Production
The idea of making the film came from William Nagle, who wrote a screenplay to produce himself; David Hannay came on board as co-producer. Dick Richards was originally meant to direct but then Philippe Mora became involved. Mora and the producers wanted to import Americans to play three roles: Leonski, his best friend Gallo and lawyer Danneberg; Actors Equity only agreed to two.

At one stage it was announced that the movie would be called Leonski and be shot in August 1981 with Don Lane as a US Army major.

The budget was originally meant to be $3 million but this was found to be inadequate during shooting and additional funds had to be raised. To save money the shooting schedule was reduced; some of the crew complained to the Australian Theatrical and Amusement Employees' Association, which put a black ban on the film. This meant it was a year before the film was released in Australia.

Cast
 James Coburn as Maj. Patrick Dannenberg
 Bill Hunter as Det. Sgt. Adams
 Reb Brown as Pvt. Edward J. Leonski
 Maurie Fields as Det. Sgt. Martin
 Max Fairchild as Maj. William Fricks
 Belinda Davey as Margot Saunders
 Randall Berger as Pvt. Anthony Gallo
 Michael Pate as Maj. Gen. Sutherland
 Jon Sidney as Gen. Douglas MacArthur
 Terence Donovan as John Curtin

Reception
James Coburn later said, "It wasn't very good. There were a lot of problems with the picture. For one thing we had an auteur producer. He was also the screenwriter. He wrote it too much like a comic strip. We also had a lot of auteurs working on the fucking thing. The director didn't have enough time to prepare it. I was very disappointed by the way it turned out. It was a hellava good story. It's too bad."

See also
Cinema of Australia

References

Sources
 Mathews, Jack, "When the Whole Truth is Not Enough", The Age, (Tuesday, 15 October 1985), p.14.

External links

Death of a Soldier at the National Film and Sound Archive
Death of a Soldier at New York Times
Death of a Soldier at Oz Movies

1986 films
Australian crime drama films
Australian films based on actual events
Australian historical drama films
Australian serial killer films
Australian World War II films
1986 crime drama films
Films shot in Melbourne
Films directed by Philippe Mora
Films set on the home front during World War II
1980s English-language films